Telcine Turner-Rolle (December 3, 1944 – May 17, 2012) was a Bahamian educator, playwright and poet.

Biography
She was born in New Providence and was educated at the University of the West Indies at Northwestern University and at the Institute of Children's Literature. She married James O. Rolle in June 1974; they had one son, Arien. She taught at several high schools and at the Bahamas Teachers Training College. Turner-Rolle joined the College of The Bahamas in 1976 and later became chair of humanities there.

She published a book of poems for children Song of the Surreys and also edited several collections of works by students from her creative writing classes. Turner-Rolle is best known for the play Woman Take Two; it was awarded the Playwriting Prize in the University of West Indies 25th Anniversary Literary Competition. She was part of the Bahama Drama Circle and help stage summer theatre productions at the auditorium of the Bahamas Teachers Training College.

She died at the age of 67.

References 

1944 births
2012 deaths
Bahamian dramatists and playwrights
People from New Providence
University of the West Indies alumni
Women dramatists and playwrights
Bahamian women poets
20th-century poets
20th-century dramatists and playwrights
20th-century women writers
Bahamian women writers
Bahamian poets
Academic staff of the University of the Bahamas